Mislinjska Dobrava is a settlement in the City Municipality of Slovenj Gradec in northern Slovenia. It lies in the Mislinja Valley southeast of the town of Slovenj Gradec. The area is part of the traditional region of Styria. The entire municipality is now included in the Carinthia Statistical Region.

Name
The name of the settlement was changed from Dobrava to Mislinjska Dobrava in 1953.

Mass grave
Mislinjska Dobrava is the site of a mass grave from the end of the Second World War. The Mislinjska Dobrava Mass Grave is located in a small woods in the middle of the settlement,  from the road from Mislinja to Slovenj Gradec. It contains the remains of Croatian soldiers or Cossacks killed in May 1945.

Cultural heritage
Remains of the Roman road from Celea to Virunum, which ran through the Mislinja Valley, have been identified near the settlement.

Airport
Slovenj Gradec Airport is a small airport located in the northern part of Mislinjska Dobrava.

References

External links
Mislinjska Dobrava at Geopedia

Populated places in the City Municipality of Slovenj Gradec
Slovenj Gradec